Ian Joseph Harvey (born 10 April 1972) is a former Australian cricketer. He was an all-rounder who played 73 One Day Internationals for Australia and was named as one of the five Wisden Cricketers of the Year for 2004 for his performances in county cricket.

International career

Australian squad
Harvey started his first-class cricket career with Victoria in the Sheffield Shield in 1993 as an all-rounder. He was called up to the Australian one day cricket team in 1997 and played 73 One Day Internationals. Harvey bowled tightly at the end of games, equipped with a well disguised slower ball, as well as being a big hitting late order batsman, however he did not hit an ODI half-century.

2003 ICC Cricket World Cup
Harvey played in the 2003 World Cup in South Africa as a replacement for the injured Shane Watson. He played in Australia's group game against Pakistan, scoring 24 at better than a run-a-ball, supporting Andrew Symonds who made a match-winning 143 not out. Defending 310, Harvey was the best bowler picking up 4 wickets, including one with his first ball, as Australia won comfortably. Harvey lost his place when Darren Lehmann and Michael Bevan returned from injury. He featured in one more group game against the Netherlands where he picked up three more wickets.

He played in the first Super Six game against Sri Lanka making a brief 5 not out at the end of Australia's innings. He did not take a wicket when he bowled but he was economical. Against New Zealand he failed with the bat making just 2 but he bowled economically again, taking 1/11 in 6 overs. In the final Super Six stage against tournament surprise package Kenya he bowled tightly without reward. However, in the run chase of 175, after Australia stuttered, he and Symonds were involved together in a 50-run partnership as they saw Australia home carrying on their unbeaten run through the tournament. Harvey finished on 24 not out. Because of an injury to Damien Martyn, he played in the semi-final against Sri Lanka.

In the tournament he played 6 games, scored 66 runs at 22.00 and took 8 wickets at 19.62.

Domestic career

Australia
Harvey played for Victoria between 1993–94 and 2004–05.

England
Harvey played for Gloucestershire from 1999 to 2003 in the English County Championship and domestic one-day competitions. He was an integral part of the team that won a number of one-day trophies, including four one-day finals in a row. Harvey also scored the first Twenty20 cricket century in 2003, and scored three T20 centuries in all. In 2004 he switched counties to play for Yorkshire for whom he played until 2005.

For 2006, he returned to play for Gloucestershire in the County Championship and Victoria in the Pura Cup. He signed to play for Derbyshire in 2007, but did not play a full season as his clearance to play as an English-qualified player was not received from the Home Office. Approval was delayed as a result of a drink-driving conviction, a decision which upset Derbyshire chief executive John Sears. Derbyshire allowed Harvey to play for Middleton Cricket Club for a weekend as a temporary replacement for their professional.

South Africa
For the 2005–06 season, Harvey played with the South African provincial side Nashua-Western Province Boland, where he also coached and commentated, sometimes doing two or all three at once.

Twenty20
Harvey excelled in the Twenty20 format, initially for Gloucestershire and Victoria. He also played in the first Indian Cricket League Twenty20 competition in 2007 for Chennai Superstars. He played in the Chennai team that won the inaugural league. He won both the man of the match award for the final and the player of the tournament award.

Being a specialist Twenty20 player, he signed short-term deals especially for the Twenty20 with Hampshire Hawks in 2008 and Northamptonshire Steelbacks in 2009. On his debut for Northants, he scored 12 with the bat but starred with the ball taking 4 for 18 off 4 overs to help them to a 17-run win against Warwickshire Bears. Harvey contracted swine flu, which kept him out of the quarter finals which Northamptonshire won. He returned to play in the finals day of the competition.

In February 2010, Harvey signed to play T20 and first-class matches for Zimbabwean franchise Southern Rocks.

Coaching career 

Harvey was appointed assistant to head coach Richard Dawson at Gloucestershire County Cricket Club in the 2015 county season.

Personal life
Harvey is uncle of Mackenzie Harvey.

References

External links

1972 births
Living people
Australia One Day International cricketers
Victoria cricketers
Gloucestershire cricketers
Yorkshire cricketers
Derbyshire cricketers
Hampshire cricketers
Northamptonshire cricketers
Cape Cobras cricketers
Wisden Cricketers of the Year
Chennai Superstars cricketers
ICL World XI cricketers
Australian cricketers
Cricketers from Victoria (Australia)
Australian cricket coaches
People from Wonthaggi